Gila Giraldo, also known as La Serrana de la Vera (born in Garganta la Olla in the last third of the 15th century—died in Plasencia, first third of the 16th century), was a Spanish serial killer who inspired numerous legends, romances and theatrical pieces during the 18th century Spanish Golden Age.

According to the legends, Giraldo was from Garganta la Olla, a few leagues from Plasencia. During the time of the Catholic Monarchs, Don Lucas de Carvajal, captain of arms, came to the place to look for soldiers. He asked for accommodation in Giraldo's house. Giraldo refused and chased him through town with his gun. Don Lucas swore to return and avenge himself with Giraldo's deceit, which he fulfilled by outwitting her and earning her honor. Discovering the deception, Giraldo retaliated by in turn by throwing Don Lucas down a ravine. He fled to the mountains, where he survived in a cave and took care of cattle. When a traveler was lost, he was welcomed by her into the cave, and after a copious amount of meal, drinks and sexual acts so that he the victim would tire and go to sleep, he would be beheaded. Many bones could be found inside the cave. Up to here, the legend according to the version of Luis Vélez de Guevara and the romances, it historically can represent a real woman—Isabel de Carvajal.

The real historical facts were probably mixed with the legends and Extremadura myths of the mountain people, for some women who lived in the mountains led a life of elemental rusticity.

Giraldo was captured and executed in the Plaza de Plasencia. The character starts in no less than twenty-one versions of romances and is later treated in different theatrical pieces by Luis Vélez de Guevara (1613), Lope de Vega (1617) and an a lo divino version by José de Valdivielso.

See also 

 List of serial killers by country

Sources 

 Manuel Gómez García, Diccionario Akal de teatro. Madrid: Ediciones Akal S. A., 1997.

Executed Spanish serial killers
Legendary Spanish people
Spanish female serial killers